The Mystic Seaport Sea Music Festival, held annually in June from 1979 to 2020 at the Mystic Seaport Museum in Mystic, Connecticut, was among the oldest, and was the largest sea music festival in the United States.  It reportedly attracted "the highest caliber of sea music performers, scholars, and fans."  The Festival was first organized by Dr. Stuart M. Frank as a place to perform and hear sea music as well as a symposium for ethnomusicologists, anthropologists, and historians.

List of Performers

1979 (1st)

1989 (10th)

1999 (20th)
Source: 
Source: 
Source:

2000 (21st)
Source:

2001 (22nd)
Source:

2003 (24th)
Source:

2004 (25th)
Source:

2006 (27th)
Source:

2007 (28th)
Source:

2008 (29th)
Source:

2009 (30th)
Source:

2010 (31st)
The Jovial Crew

2011 (32nd)
Source:

2012 (33rd)
Source:

2013 (34th)
Source:

2014 (35th)
Source:

2015 (36th)
Source:

2016 (37th)
Source:

See also

List of maritime music festivals
Maritime music

References

External links

Music festivals in Connecticut
Maritime music festivals